The Martha Mitchell effect occurs when a medical professional labels a patient's accurate perception of real events as delusional, resulting in misdiagnosis.

Description
According to Bell et al., "Sometimes, improbable reports are erroneously assumed to be symptoms of mental illness (Maher, 1998)", due to a "failure or inability to verify whether the events have actually taken place, no matter how improbable intuitively they might appear to the busy clinician".

Examples of such situations are:

 Pursuit by organized criminals
 Surveillance by law enforcement officers
 Infidelity by a spouse
 Physical issues

Quoting psychotherapist Joseph Berke, the authors report that, "even paranoids have enemies". Delusions are "abnormal beliefs" and may be bizarre (considered impossible to be true), or non-bizarre (possible, but considered by the clinician as highly improbable). Beliefs about being poisoned, followed, marital infidelity or a conspiracy in the workplace are examples of non-bizarre beliefs that may be considered delusions. Any patient can be misdiagnosed by clinicians, especially patients with a history of paranoid delusions.

Patients may be diagnosed as delusional when their grievances concern health care workers or health care institutions, even when the patient has no history of delusion. "A patient arriving claiming to have been injured by another health care professional is regarded as a crazy person who potentially could ruin the career of an innocent colleague."

Origin
Psychologist Brendan Maher named the effect after Martha Mitchell. Mitchell was the wife of John Mitchell, United States Attorney General in the Nixon administration. When she alleged that White House officials were engaged in illegal activities, her claims were attributed to mental illness. Ultimately, however, the facts of the Watergate scandal vindicated her and garnered her the label "The Cassandra of Watergate". 

Although it has been stated that many of her allegations remain unproven, such as her claim that she had been drugged and put under guard during a visit to California after her husband was summoned back to Washington, D.C. in order to prevent her from leaving the hotel or making phone calls to the news media, James McCord confirmed in 1975 that her story was true, as reported in The New York Times. 

More evidence supporting Mitchell's claims was published in a 2017 news article in Newsweek about the appointment of a U.S. ambassador. In 2022, Netflix released a documentary titled The Martha Mitchell Effect.

See also
 Adrian Schoolcraft
 Argument from ignorance
 False memory
 Gaslighting
 Goldwater rule
 Psychosis
 Rosenhan experiment
 Gustl Mollath
 Rosemary's Baby - a novel in which the central character is a victim of the Martha Mitchell effect

References

Popular psychology
Watergate scandal
Medical error
Medical diagnosis
Delusions
Psychiatric false diagnosis